A coaxial antenna (often known as a coaxial dipole) is a particular form of a half-wave dipole antenna, most often employed as a vertically polarized omnidirectional antenna.

History
Arnold B. Bailey was granted the US patent 2,184,729 Antenna System on December 26, 1939 after filing in 1937 for a vertical antenna providing coaxial element sleeve structures.

Bonnie Crystal was granted the US patent 7,151,497  Coaxial Antenna System on December 19, 2006 after filing in 2003 for new types of coaxial antennas with reduced size providing efficient broadband, wideband and controlled bandwidths, using radiation by the outside of the coaxial elements.

Configuration
In the most basic form, a quarter-wavelength section of coaxial cable is prepared such that the inner and outer conductors are separate but still attached to the remaining cable.

The outer (shield) conductor is connected to a quarter-wavelength conducting sleeve into which the cable is inserted, and the inner conductor protrudes vertically above the sleeve for a quarter-wavelength. Also, additional quarter-wavelength sections may be connected to the outer conductor to form a better ground plane.

Bazooka Dipole coaxial antenna
Dipole antennas constructed using coaxial cables with shorted ends are often given the name "Bazooka" dipoles.

See also
Amateur radio
Antennas
Coaxial cable
Dipole antenna

External links 

Bailey's 1939 patent (PDF)
Coaxial Antenna System patent number 7151497

Radio frequency antenna types
Antennas (radio)